Massiliensis is a surname.  Notable people with the surname include:

 Guillelmus Massiliensis thirteenth century English astrologer
 Joannes Massiliensis (c. 370 – 435), Christian theologian